Žirovnica is a village in the municipality of Mavrovo and Rostuša, North Macedonia.

Demographics
Žirnovnica (Zhirnovinec) is recorded in the Ottoman defter of 1467 as a village in the ziamet of Reka which was under the authority of Karagöz Bey. The village had a total of 22 households and the anthroponymy attested depicts a mixed Albanian-Slavic character (e.g., Petko Palgushi).   

Žirovnica has traditionally been inhabited by a Muslim Macedonian (Torbeš) population. The village contains municipal services and civic buildings. As such in recent decades, some Upper Reka Albanian residents from neighbouring Vrbjani have migrated to Žirovnica and number 258 people.

According to the 2002 census, the village had a total of 1608 inhabitants. Ethnic groups in the village include:

Macedonians 1314
Albanians 258
Turks 20
Bosniaks 4
Others 12

References

Villages in Mavrovo and Rostuša Municipality
Albanian communities in North Macedonia
Macedonian Muslim villages